Macara pasaleuca is a moth of the family Megalopygidae. It was described by Peter Maassen in 1899. It is found in Colombia.

References

Moths described in 1899
Megalopygidae